Gherabari  ] in Jhapa District in the Koshi Province of south-eastern Nepal. At the time of the 1991 Nepal census it had a population of 6049 people living in 1174 individual households. Word member Sri Ranjti Kumar Limbu, spoken language Nepali Rajbanshi,Surjapuri language

References

wesite kachankawal

External links
 ऐन, कानुन तथा निर्देशिका

Populated places in Jhapa District